The Pat Finucane Centre (PFC) is a human rights advocacy and lobbying entity in Northern Ireland.  Named in honour of murdered solicitor Pat Finucane, it operates advice centres in Derry and Newry, dealing mainly with complaints from Irish nationalists and republicans. The PFC promotes a nonviolent ethos, believing that the Northern Irish conflict arose mainly due to the government's failure to uphold Article 7 of the Universal Declaration of Human Rights: 
The PFC also states that the criminal justice system is not conducive to justice regarding crimes during the Northern Irish conflict, and, following a relative's request, one of the core activities of the PFC is to research and document individual cases of death during the conflict.

References

External links
 Official site
 Entry in Irishlinks

Charities based in Northern Ireland
The Troubles in Belfast